Leberecht Maass (or Maaß) (24 November 1863 – 28 August 1914) was the Konteradmiral who commanded the German naval forces at the first Battle of Heligoland Bight.  He lost his life when his flagship, the light cruiser , was sunk by British battlecruisers commanded by Vice Admiral David Beatty.

Early life
Leberecht Maass was born in Korkenhagen, Province of Pomerania. Maass entered the Kaiserliche Marine in 1863. Between 1893 and 1895 Maass commanded a torpedoboat. Between 1898 and 1901 he commanded a squadron and between 1903 and 1906 he was department chief in the Torpedo department. Maass served as director of the Naval School (1906-1908) and was promoted to captain in March 1908. He commanded the cruiser  (April 1908-June 1909), the armored cruiser  (March 1909-June 1910) and the old battleship  (August 1910-September 1910). In October 1910 Maass was promoted to kommandeur. On 9 December 1913 Maass was promoted to Konteradmiral, flying his flag on the cruiser Cöln. At the start of the First World War, Maass served as Leader of the torpedoboats and commander of the second scouting squadron.

Death at the Battle of Heligoland Bight

In the early morning hours the Harwich Force encountered German torpedo boats on patrol west of Heligoland. They were subsequently joined by yet another light cruiser, Mainz out of Emden. Tyrwhitt's Arethusa was severely damaged by Frauenlob, but the German cruiser also suffered heavy hits and retreated to Heligoland. In the fog and smoke, Mainz found herself between Tyrwhitt's and Goodenough's forces and was sunk by them after a prolonged battle.

Namesake
The German navy named a World War II destroyer after Maass.

References

External links
Battle of Heligoland Bight

1863 births
1914 deaths
Captains who went down with the ship
People from Goleniów County
German military personnel killed in World War I
Imperial German Navy admirals of World War I
People from the Province of Pomerania
People lost at sea
Recipients of the Order of the Sword
Counter admirals of the Imperial German Navy